Vaucluse Public School (abbreviation VPS) is a school located in Vaucluse, Sydney, New South Wales, Australia. It is a co-educational public school operated by the New South Wales Department of Education with students from years K to 6. The school was established in 1858.

History 
It was opened in 1858 and celebrated 150 years in 2008.

Notable alumni 
 Russell Crowe, Academy Award-winning actor
 Joshua Gans, professor and economist
 Simon Townsend, journalist and TV personality
 Malcolm Turnbull, 29th Prime Minister of Australia (2015–2018)
 Peter Weir, film director

See also 
 List of Government schools in New South Wales

External links
 Vaucluse Public School website

Public primary schools in Sydney
School buildings completed in 1858
Educational institutions established in 1858
1858 establishments in Australia